Babylon is an opera in seven scenes by Jörg Widmann, with a libretto in German by Peter Sloterdijk. The opera describes life in a multi-religious and multi-cultural metropolis. It was premiered by the Bavarian State Opera, conducted by Kent Nagano, on 27 October 2012.

Background and performance history
The stage work Babylon was written by Jörg Widmann on a commission by the Bavarian State Opera. The opera was composed from 2011 to 2012. Librettist and composer were not held to any restrictions. The librettist Peter Sloterdijk describes life in a multi-religious and multi-cultural metropolis, the rise and fall of an empire. His essay God's Zeal, that deals with the three major monotheistic religions, Judaism, Christianity and Islam, possibly influenced the libretto.

The Bavarian State Opera presented the world premiere of Widmann's Babylon, conducted by Kent Nagano on 27 October 2012 in National Theatre Munich. The production was directed by Carlus Padrissa (La Fura dels Baus).

A revised version of the opera was premiered on 9 March 2019 at the Staatsoper Unter den Linden Berlin. Conductor of the new production by Andreas Kriegenburg was Christopher Ward, replacing Daniel Barenboim. In the revision Widmann used live electronics for the first time at the end. The action takes place in a cave-like underground.

In 2022, a new production of the opera, based on the revised version, was performed by the Staatstheater Wiesbaden. It was part of the May Festival Wiesbaden. The setting is an airport lounge. Sarah Traubel appeared as Inanna, Daniela Kerck directed her own stage design, projections by London-based video designer Astrid Steiner, and Albert Horne was the musical director.

The first performance of Widmann's Babylon Suite, a commission of Grafenegg Festival and Deutsches Symphonie-Orchester Berlin, took place on 21 August 2014 in Grafenegg under the direction of Kent Nagano. The Babylon Suite is the concertante version of Widmann's opera.

Reception
The premiere of Babylon was reviewed critically by several newspapers. The New York Times noted that Widmann's hard work received a major forum, that Sloterdijk's libretto is overstuffed and often inscrutable, and the production is extravagant. Die Zeit wrote about an indifferent libretto, a monstrous score and old men's lust, Süddeutsche Zeitung about howling wind players, opulent pictures and strange music. Die Welt wrote: "alphabet soup of sound salad: orgiastic, bombastic" (""). Die Deutsche Bühne wrote 2022: "colorful, visually stunning staging".

The premiere of the revision of the opera in 2019 received positive and mostly negative "icely" reviews.

Die Deutsche Bühne wrote about the 2022 Wiesbaden production: "Wiesbaden made a convincing plea for Widmann's Babylon, but it remains to be seen whether the piece will be suitable for the repertoire."

Music
Babylon is a polystylistic opera. A special musical style is Widmann's version of the Bayerischer Defiliermarsch and Tiroler Holzhackerbuab`n from his composition Dubairische Tänze in Scene III "The New Year Festival". Self-quotation within the opera are Teufel Amor, Con brio, Antiphon and Messe. Another example is a baroque chorale. The work is characterized by cinematic editing techniques and various multimedia layers. Widmann remains on the ground of tonality, but pushes it to the limits of the diatonic. Significant are the colossal chord layers in the manner of Gustav Mahler or Alban Berg. References are made to Strauss's Salome and Mozart’s Magic Flute.

Roles

Instrumentation
Widmann scored Babylon for a large orchestra with 90 players:
 Woodwinds: 4 flutes (all doubling piccolo, 3rd doubling alto flute, 4th doubling bass flute), 4 oboes (2nd doubling oboe d'amore, 3rd doubling cor anglais, 4th doubling heckelphone), 4 clarinets in B (2nd doubling clarinet in E, 3rd doubling bass clarinet, 4th doubling double bass clarinet), 4 bassoons (3rd and 4th double bassoon)
 Brass: 4 horns (doubling 4 natural horns), 4 trumpets, 4 trombones (3rd and 4th doubling bass trombone or contrabass trombone), tuba
 Strings: 14 violins I, 12 violins II, 10 violas, 8 cellos, 8 double basses (4 of them 5-stringed)
 Percussion: 4 players, timpani
 2 harps, celesta, accordion, piano, organ

Synopsis
The opera is about the conflicts that arise from the love of Tammu, a Jew in exile, to Inanna, a Babylonian priestess in the temple of free love.

Each of the seven scenes comes with its own musical form, Widmann adds seven septets, seven dancers.

The seven scenes of the opera:

Prologue
 "In Front of the Relics of the Walls of a Ruined City"
 Scorpion Man

Scene I
 "Within the Walls of Babylon" (duration: 45 min)
Tammu falls in love with Inanna.

Scene II
 "Flood and Star Terror"
 planet septet
The Euphrates leaves its bed, the flood comes expressed by chaos and confusion. After the flood, peace and order will be achieved between heaven and earth through a human sacrifice.

Scene III
 "The New Year Festival"
 genitalia septets
 monkey septet
An orgiastic, carnival-like New Year festival with processions, cabaret numbers, and excesses begins. The Jews consider this as blasphemy.

Scene IV
 "At the Waters of Babylon"
The Jews reflect about their religion. They try to tolerate some of the sacrificial practices. Tammu is selected by the Babylonian Priest King to be sacrificed.

Interlude
 "Babylon Idyll, Night Music for Hanging Gardens"

Scene V
 "The Feast of the Sacrifice"
Tammu is sacrificed.

Scene VI
 "Inanna in the Underworld"
Inanna rescues Tammu from the underworld.

Scene VII
 "The New Rainbow" (duration: 7 min)
 rainbow septet
A new covenant with humankind, based on number seven, replaces the old sacrifice.

Epilogue
 "The constellation of the Scorpion"
 The scorpion directs its sting on itself, it kills the illusion, to be reborn in its higher form, the eagle.

Notes

References

Citations

Bibliography

Further reading

External links
 
 Revised version: 

Operas by Jörg Widmann
German-language operas
2012 operas
Operas
Works by Peter Sloterdijk